Greg Novak (September 4, 1950 – March 7, 2012) was a wargame designer, author of dozens of games, rules supplements and scenario books, his most notable contributions including the Volley & Bayonet series and several works about the American War of Independence.

Biography
Born on September 4, 1950, in Chicago, son of George and Sylvia (Stepnowski) Novak, and married to Donna Oakes Gerbino on July 19, 1997, Greg Novak worked as a librarian at Edison and Jefferson middle schools for 31 years, and for the Champaign Office of Education. He was active in the Champaign Teachers Federation, serving as a building steward, member of the collective bargaining unit, vice president and president. Upon his retirement he was elected to the Champaign Board of Education.  After his death Champaign Unit 4 Schools named their Alternative High School facility in his honor.

Wargaming 
Greg Novak was a key figure in the wargaming hobby, leaving a lasting and internationally recognized legacy both as an author and as a promoter of wargaming events. Among his main contributions as an author should be listed :

Boardgames

 Guilford Courthouse (Series 120) – GDW1978

Rules
 Fire and Steel - Rules for Battles with System 7 Napoleonics, GDW 1978 (with John Harshman and Rich Banner) 
 Charlie Company - Infantry Combat in Vietnam 1965-1972, Ulster Imports 1988 (with John Reeves) 
 Yellow Ribbon : Rules for the Indian Wars, 1850-1890, Ulster Imports 1988 
 Over the Top, WW1 Command Decision series rules, GDW 1990 
 Volley & Bayonet, GDW 1994 (with Frank Chadwick) 
 Charlie Company - Infantry Combat in Vietnam 1965-1972 (2nd ed), RAFM 1997 (with John Reeves) 
 Volley & Bayonet: Road to Glory, TOB Games 2008 (with Frank Chadwick)

Rules supplements and Scenario books
 And Continually Wear the Blue: A Short Guide to the U.S. Army & the 'Indian Wars' 1850-90, RAFM 1989 (with Mike Gilbert). 
 A Guide to the American War of Independence in the North, Ulster Imports 1990 
 Remember the Maine and to Hell with Spain : Being a Wargamer's Guide to the Spanish American War 1898, Ulster Imports, 1990 
 Battles of the American Civil War – A Volley & Bayonet supplement, GDW 1994 
 The Rough Riders - Vol.1: A Volley & Bayonet Supplement for the Spanish–American War, GDW 1999 (with Frank Chadwick). 
 The Rough Riders - Vol.2: A Volley & Bayonet Supplement for the Spanish–American War, GDW 1999 (with Frank Chadwick). 
 The American War of Independence - Book 1: The Northern Campaigns, Old Glory 
 The American War of Independence - Book 2: The Southern Campaigns, Old Glory

Greg Novak was also Editor of the Command Post Quarterly magazine (published by the GDW and Emperor's Headquarters)-

Awards
Member of the Legion of Honour, Historical Miniatures Gaming Society - East

References

External links
Bring up the rear (Greg Novak's blog)
 

School board members in Illinois
Board game designers
1950 births
2012 deaths